Alexander Douglas MacLellan (April 30, 1930 – March 18, 2022) was a Canadian ice hockey defenceman who won three consecutive National Championships with Michigan.

Career
Hailing from Montreal, MacLellan was one of a slew of Canadians who played for Vic Heyliger on his powerhouse Michigan teams in the 1950s. After a year on the freshman team, MacLellan joined the varsity squad for the 1950–51 season and the team didn't miss a beat; the Wolverines finished the regular season with a record of 20–4–1 and received the top western seed. Michigan dominated the competition, winning both games by 6 goals and captured their second National Championship. The following year was more of the same and the Wolverines' 20–4 mark got them the top seed once more. MacLellan scored his first postseason goal against St. Lawrence in the semifinal and the Wolverines completely shut down Colorado College in the final.

In MacLellan's senior season the Wolverines took a step back, finishing with a 15–7 record but tied for the MCHL lead, giving them a sixth consecutive tournament berth. While the offense had declined during the season, the defense was still a force to be reckoned with and, as the leader of the group, MacLellan was named as an AHCA First Team All-American. In the tournament the offense returned in full and blew the competition out of the water; Michigan scored 21 goals in two games and won their third consecutive title. MacLellan and the three other seniors on the team are the only players in the history of the NCAA to win three consecutive Division I championships (as of 2020).

MacLellan graduated from the school of Business Administration and was inducted into the Michigan Dekers Hall of Fame in 1978. In 2018 MacLellan was ranked as the 45th best player in the history of the program. MacLellan died on March 18, 2022, aged 91.

Statistics

Regular season and playoffs

Awards and honors

References

External links

1930 births
2022 deaths
Canadian ice hockey defencemen
Anglophone Quebec people
Ice hockey people from Montreal
Michigan Wolverines men's ice hockey players
NCAA men's ice hockey national champions
AHCA Division I men's ice hockey All-Americans